Nicholas Smit (born 24 February 1993) is a South African cricketer. He made his first-class debut on 17 October 2019, for North West in the 2019–20 CSA 3-Day Provincial Cup, scoring 153 runs in the first innings. He made his List A debut on 20 October 2019, for North West in the 2019–20 CSA Provincial One-Day Challenge, where he also scored a century.

References

External links
 

1993 births
Living people
South African cricketers
North West cricketers
Place of birth missing (living people)